Swaminathan S. Anklesaria Aiyar (born 12 October 1938) is an Indian economist, journalist, and columnist. He is consulting editor for the Economic Times and writes regularly for the Economic Times and The Times of India. He is also a Research Fellow at the Cato Institute. He is the elder brother of Mani Shankar Aiyar, who is a senior Congress leader.

Early life
Aiyar was born to V. Shankar Aiyar, a chartered accountant, and Bhagyalakshmi Shankar. He is the older brother of, Mani Shankar Aiyar a politician who has served as Minister for Panchayati Raj in the Indian government.

An alumnus of Welham Boys' School, The Doon School, and St Stephen's College, University of Delhi, he earned a master's degree in economics from Magdalen College, Oxford.

Career
He is a research fellow at the Cato Institute, a libertarian think tank in Washington D.C., and an occasional consultant to the World Bank.

He previously served as editor of The Economic Times (1992–94), The Financial Express (1988–90) and Eastern Economist (1980–82).

Aiyar writes a weekly column titled "Swaminomics" in the Times of India, where he discusses economic and political issues pertaining to India and the world. Aiyar has prepared several reports and papers for the World Bank. In 1976–85 and 1990–98, he was also the India correspondent of The Economist.

He has written two books: Towards Globalisation (1992) and Swaminomics: Escape from the Benevolent Zookeepers (2008).

He is currently consulting editor of The Economic Times, India's leading financial daily that is part of Bennett, Coleman & Co, the same company that owns The Times of India.

Personal life
Aiyar has three children: Pallavi Aiyar, Shekhar Aiyar, and Rustam Aiyar from his previous marriage with Gitanjali Aiyar. He is an atheist.

Bibliography
 Towards Globalisation (1992)
 Swaminomics: Escape from the Benevolent Zookeepers (2008)

References

External links
 Swaminomics
 

Alumni of Magdalen College, Oxford
Indian atheists
Indian libertarians
Indian classical liberals
Journalists from Tamil Nadu
Living people
1942 births
Indian business and financial journalists
Indian newspaper editors
The Times of India journalists
Delhi University alumni
The Doon School alumni
Cato Institute people
Indian male journalists
20th-century Indian journalists
Ankleshwar
Member of the Mont Pelerin Society